Zapote River may refer to the following:

 Zapote River (Costa Rica)
 Zapote River (Philippines)